Cindy Lee Berryhill (born June 12, 1965)  is an American singer-songwriter, co-founder of the New York Antifolk movement, who recorded multiple albums, hit singles, and compilations over the years.

Biography
Berryhill was born in Silver Lake, Los Angeles, California and grew up in various parts of California, and began playing the guitar at the age of ten, which then led to her love of songwriting.  Her debut album Who's Gonna Save The World? (Rhino/Capitol) came out in October 1987 and was followed by the Lenny Kaye produced, Naked Movie Star (Rhino/WEA) in 1989. In Allmusic's online Cindy Lee Berryhill Biography entry (2008), Richie Unterberger wrote, "The San Diegan's 1987 debut, Who's Gonna Save the World?, may be her best simply because it is her most straightforward. Then as now, she was most effective, ironically, at her most basic and serious." By contrast, Stewart Mason in his four and a half star review of her third album, calls it her "first completely solid and intriguing effort".

Berryhill, like Brenda Kahn, Paleface, Beck, Michelle Shocked and John S. Hall were early proponents of the New York City Anti-folk movement. She is featured in the documentary Mariposa: Under a Stormy Sky along with Emmylou Harris, The Violent Femmes, Daniel Lanois and others.

It would be another six years before her third album Garage Orchestra (Cargo/Earth) would be released. Garage Orchestra was a tin-can-pop inflected departure from her earlier folkier albums and garnered a 4-star review in Rolling Stone. In 1995 her boyfriend and husband-to-be, rock writer Paul Williams suffered a brain injury in a bicycle accident, and Berryhill put off the making of her next album until 1996's Straight Outta Marysville. In 1997, Paul and Cindy were married, and then Paul began to develop early onset dementia as a result of his bicycle accident, which ultimately led to him requiring full-time care in 2009. 

In 1999, Berryhill's novel, Memoirs of A Female Messiah was released along with a live album entitled Living Room 16. After the birth of Berryhill and Williams's son in 2001, she began a song cycle that included the song "Beloved Stranger", that was inspired by her experiences with her husband's brain injury and the awareness that many soldiers were coming home from war with similar injuries. In 2008, the album Beloved Stranger (Populuxe) was released.

Berryhill's second cousin was the surfboard shaper Dale Velzy (his mother was a Berryhill) and her first cousin is Damon Berryhill who was a major league baseball player and now works for the Braves.

Berryhill married rock writer Paul Williams, who passed away on March 27, 2013, after spending several years in a nursing home. Berryhill currently lives in Encinitas, California with her son, Alexander Berryhill-Williams. 

Her seventh album, The Adventurist was released on March 10, 2017, on Omnivore Records.

Partial discography
All US releases unless otherwise noted.

Albums
 Who’s Gonna Save The World (Rhino, 1987) also released by: Spain / Sam Records, Germany / Zensor Records and England / New Routes Records
 Naked Movie Star (Rhino, 1989) also released by: Germany, Greece and Italy, all on Rhino Records, England / Awareness Records
 Garage Orchestra (Cargo, 1994) also released in England by Unique Gravity
 Straight Outta Marysville (Cargo, 1996) also released in England by Demon Records 
 Living Room 16 (Griffith Park Records – GPR001, 1999) live
 Beloved Stranger (Populuxe, 2008)
 The Adventurist (Omnivore, 2017)

Singles and EPs
 "Indirectly Yours" / "She Had Everything" (Indisc Beneluxe, 1989) Belgium only 7" & CD
 "Me, Steve, Kirk And Keith" / "Indirectly Yours" (Awareness, 1989) England only 7" & 12"
 "Me, Steve, Kirk And Keith" / "Baby Should I Have The Baby" (EMI/Rhino RPS 30, 1989) Australia promo only 7" 
 "Baby Should I Have The Baby" / "Supernatural Fact" (Rhino, 1989) Promo only CD single 
 "High Jump" / "Baby Should I Have The Baby" / "Weeping Descent of Sleep" (Cargo-Earth Music 014, 1994) CDEP
 "Woke Up From A Dream" / "Emperor: Little Boots" (Omnivore Recordings, 2020) download only with booklet

Compilations
 Fast Folk Musical Magazine Vol. 2, No. 8 (FFMM, 1985) includes: "Steve On H"
 The Best Of The Radio Tokyo Tapes  (Chameleon, 1987) includes: "Headin' For The Borderline"
 CMJ Presents Certain Damage! - Volume 3  (CMJ, 1987) includes: "She Had Everything"
 Don't Read While You Listen! (Rhino, 1988) includes: "She Had Everything", "Damn, I Wish I Was A Man", "Spe-c-i-al Ingredient"
 Broome Closet Anti-Folk Sessions  (109 Records, 1989) includes: "Every Home Has A Setting Sun", "Take A Giant Step"
 Acoustic Variations  (Orphan, 1993) includes: "Father of the Seventh Son"
 The 4th Annual San Diego Music Awards (SLAAM, 1994) includes: "Every Someone Tonight"
 Tales From The Rhino (Rhino, 1994) includes: "She Had Everything"
 Cargo Records 1995 Fall Sampler (Cargo, 1995) includes: "Gary Handeman"
 SXSW Live Vol.3  (SXSW, 1995) includes: "I Wonder Why"
 Doin' It Right (Demon, 1996) England only - includes: "Diane"
 Future Folklore, Volume 1 (B.A.M., authorized free cassette distribution 1997) includes April 18, 1997 live recordings of: "Damn I Wish I Was A Man", "Riddle Riddle", "She Won't Even Try", "Scariest Thing In The World", "Antarctica", "Family Tree"
 Future Folklore, Volume 2 (B.A.M., authorized free cassette distribution 1997) includes April 18, 1997 live recordings of: "Diane", "Jane And John", "Memoirs Of A Female Messiah"(reading), "California", "Aquamarine", "Radio Astronomy" 
 Ocean – A Celebration Of San Diego Women’s Music (SLAAM, 1998) includes: "High Jump"
 Future Folklore, Volume 3 (B.A.M., authorized free cassette distribution 1998) includes November 29, 1997 live recordings of: "Aquamarine", "UFO Suite", "God Bless The Living Room Tour"
 Drinking From Puddles: A Radio History (Kill Rock Stars, 1999) includes: "Aquamarine"
 San Francisco Song Cycle Vol 1  (2000) includes: "The Skip Song"
 Music Is Love  (Route 61 Music, 2012) includes: "It Doesn't Matter" (Manassas / Stephen Stills cover)

References

External links
 Cindy Lee Berryhill
 Paul Williams

Anti-folk musicians
American singer-songwriters
1965 births
Living people
Women punk rock singers